The 2001 Rally Catalunya (formally the 37th Rallye Catalunya - Costa Brava) was the fourth round of the 2001 World Rally Championship. The race was held over three days between 23 March and 25 March 2001, and was won by Peugeot's Didier Auriol, his 20th win in the World Rally Championship.

Background

Entry list

Itinerary
All dates and times are CET (UTC+1) from 23 to 24 March 2001 and CEST (UTC+2) on 25 March 2001.

Results

Overall

World Rally Cars

Classification

Special stages

Championship standings

FIA Cup for Production Rally Drivers

Classification

Special stages

Championship standings

FIA Cup for Super 1600 Drivers

Classification

Special stages

Championship standings

References

External links 
 Official website of the World Rally Championship

Catalunya
Rally Catalunya
Rally Catalunya